Get Ready to Be Boyzvoiced is a 2000 Norwegian mockumentary about a fictional boy band called Boyzvoice. Outside Norway, it has been screened multiple times on Australian television channel SBS.

Plot
The band is a three-piece vocal group dominated by their utterly untalented lead singer "M*Pete". When they are caught lip-synching before the release of their first album, scandal erupts (fed also by their manager's physically assaulting an elderly male and an elderly female member of the Salvation Army and the revelation that M*Pete's 16-year-old girlfriend is actually only 12) and they are dropped by their record company. They consider leaving the music industry, but their manager gets them a sponsorship deal with a Norwegian fish finger manufacturer. Ultimately they bounce back to fame after an appearance at the HitAwards Norwegian music awards show.

Cast
 Espen Eckbo as M'Pete, Ove, Waldemar, Web Designer, Radio DJ, Security Guard
 Øyvind Thoen as Hot Tub
 Kaare Daniel Steen as Roar
 Henrik Elvestad as Manager Timothy Dahle
 Linn Skåber as Wenche Pettersen (Public Relations Manager)
 Atle Antonsen as Titano Music Festival Arranger
 Jon Øigarden as Concert Arranger Sverre Bratsberg
 Trond-Viggo Torgersen as Producer Jens Ovesen
 Jorunn Kjellsby as  Ingrid Lund-Bergseter (the boys' mum)
 Harald Brenna as Alf Lund-Bergseter (the boys' dad)
 Ida Thorkildsen Valvik as Stine (M'Pete's girlfriend)
 Bernhard Arnø as Choreographer Stian Mørdre
 Nikis Theophilakis as Lars Erik Martinsen (of Frionor Seafoods)
 Tony Totino as Brian Kauffman (Head of record company)
 Trond Høvik as Salvation Army Officer
 Eivind Sander as Se & Hør Journalist
 Thorkil Johan Aschehoug as Vocal coach
 Arild Svensgam as Head of removals firm where M'Pete and Hot Tub work
 Bodil Lahelle as Lady of the Salvation Army
 Espen Søland as Vocal Analyst
 Heine Totland as himself
 Peter Singsaas as himself
 Espen Lind as himself
 Morten Abel as himself
 Christian Ingebrigtsen as himself
 Ben Adams as himself
 Paul Marazzi as himself
 Mark Read as himself
 Dorthe Skappel as herself
 Per Kristian Indrehus as himself
 Ingrid Boon Ulfsby as M'Pete's Cousin in "Cousin" video

Production
Although the actors portraying band members pretend to be utterly talentless and unable to get one single note right in the film, all Boyzvoices vocals were in reality performed by actor Øyvind Thoen (Hot Tub), and, on occasion, actor Espen Eckbo (M'Pete).

External links 
 
 Movietrailer from filmweb.no (QuickTime)

2000 films
Films about boy bands
Norwegian boy bands
2000s mockumentary films
2000s Norwegian-language films
Norwegian comedy films
2000 comedy films